Kauneonga Lake is a hamlet in Sullivan County, New York, United States. Kauneonga Lake has a post office with ZIP code 12749.

References

Hamlets in Sullivan County, New York
Hamlets in New York (state)